Islington is a settlement in Jamaica. It has a population of 2,897 as of 2009.

Islington is the birthplace of reggae artist Capelton.

References

Populated places in Saint Mary Parish, Jamaica